Chen Ji may refer to:

 Chen Ji (Yuanfang) (陳紀), courtesy name Yuanfang (元方), Eastern Han dynasty official, father of Chen Qun
 Chen Ji (陳紀), official serving under the Eastern Han dynasty warlord Yuan Shu
 Chen Ji (handballer) (陈积; born 1976), handball player
 Chen Ji (footballer) (陈吉; born 1997), football player
 Chen Ji (陳紀), a term referring to the volumes chronicling the history of the Chen dynasty (557-589) in the Zizhi Tongjian